The ÍR men's football team, commonly known as ÍR is the men's football department of Íþróttafélag Reykjavíkur. It is based in Reykjavík, Iceland and currently plays in 2. deild karla.

History
Although football was one of the first sports practiced at Íþróttafélag Reykjavíkur, it's football department was not formally founded until 7 March 1939. In 1943, Guðmundur S. Hofdal, the former trainer of the Olympic gold-winners Winnipeg Falcons, was hired as a coach. In 1944 it fielded a senior team in the national tournament for the first time. After losing the first game 0-8 to Fram, the team withdrew from the tournament.
It played in the top-tier Úrvalsdeild karla in 1998 when it was relegated after the last game of the season.

Honours

Titles
1. deild karla:
Runner-ups: 1997

2. deild karla:
Winners: 2008, 2016
Runner-ups: 1998

3. deild karla: 1985
Winners: 1985
Source

Awards
Úrvalsdeild Young Player of the Year:
 Ólafur Þór Gunnarsson: 1998

Current squad

References

External links
Official homepage

 
Football clubs in Iceland
Football clubs in Reykjavík